Spinoclosterium is a genus of green algae, specifically of the Closteriaceae.

References

External links

Scientific references

Scientific databases

 
 AlgaTerra database
 Index Nominum Genericorum

Desmidiales
Charophyta genera